Abellana is a surname. Notable people with the surname include:

 Carla Abellana (born 1986), Filipina actress and model
 Hilario Abellana (1896–1945), Filipino lawyer and politician
 Martin Abellana (1904–1989), Filipino writer
 Martino Abellana (1914–1986), Filipino painter
 Ramon Abellana (born 1911), Filipino sculptor and composer